In enzymology, a 3-ethylmalate synthase is an enzyme that catalyzes the chemical reaction

butanoyl-CoA + H2O + glyoxylate  3-ethylmalate + CoA

The 3 substrates of this enzyme are butanoyl-CoA, H2O, and glyoxylate, whereas its two products are 3-ethylmalate and CoA.

This enzyme belongs to the family of transferases, specifically those acyltransferases that convert acyl groups into alkyl groups on transfer.  The systematic name of this enzyme class is butanoyl-CoA:glyoxylate C-butanoyltransferase (thioester-hydrolysing, 1-carboxypropyl-forming). Other names in common use include 2-ethyl-3-hydroxybutanedioate synthase, and 3-ethylmalate glyoxylate-lyase (CoA-butanoylating).  This enzyme participates in glyoxylate and dicarboxylate metabolism.

References

 

EC 2.3.3
Enzymes of unknown structure